Ami Aar Amar Girlfriends is a 2013 Indian Bengali language film directed by Mainak Bhaumik. The story of the film revolves around the friendship of three Bengali girls, and their world.

Plot 
"Ami Aar Amar Girlfriends" is an out of the bracket tale of about three women, who belong to different spheres of the society professionally. The film showcases them having once in a lifetime trip and sharing their experiences and realizations of life from the dimension in which they have faced it. Previously on numerous occasions audience have witnessed stories friendship and bonding among men onscreen, but this is the first opportunity to take a dive inside women's world and the rhythm of their heartbeat.

Cast 
 Raima Sen
 Swastika Mukherjee
 Parno Mittra
 Vikram Chatterjee
 Anubrata Basu
 Biswanath Basu

Theme 
The story of the film revolves around friendship of three Bengali girls, an academic counsellor, another a radio jockey. Parno Mittra told about the theme of the movie— It was a girls' world. Paro-ninda-paro-charcha was our primary activity on the sets, very characteristic of an all-girl-gang. But we would also drag Mainak into our PNPC sessions.

Soundtrack

See also 
 All I Want Is Everything

References 

Bengali-language Indian films
2010s Bengali-language films
2013 films
Indian sex comedy films
Films directed by Mainak Bhaumik